Serhiy Oleksandrovych Perepadenko (born 26 May 1972) is a former Ukrainian professional footballer.

Club career
He made his professional debut in the Soviet Second League in 1989 for FC Torpedo Zaporizhia.

Personal life
He is the younger brother of Gennadiy Perepadenko.

Honours
 Soviet Top League runner-up: 1991.
 Soviet Cup winner: 1992.
 Russian Premier League runner-up: 1995.
 Russian Premier League bronze: 1994.

References

1972 births
Footballers from Zaporizhzhia
Living people
Soviet footballers
Ukrainian footballers
Ukrainian expatriate footballers
Association football midfielders
Association football forwards
FC Torpedo Zaporizhzhia players
FC Spartak Moscow players
FC Lokomotiv Moscow players
Expatriate footballers in Russia
Expatriate footballers in Spain
Soviet Top League players
Russian Premier League players